The Fort Wayne Hoosiers (originally the Fort Wayne Caseys) were an American basketball team based in Fort Wayne, Indiana that was a member of the American Basketball League.

Year-by-year

See also
History of sports in Fort Wayne, Indiana

Sports in Fort Wayne, Indiana
Basketball teams in Indiana